DJ Skillz is a French disc jockey and turntablist, winner of the DMC World DJ Championship in 2018, 2019, 2020.

Biography 
He is from Biarritz. His real name is Jimmy Da Costa Santos. He becomes DJ at twenty.

His DJ's name is inspired by the song Skills of the American hip hop duo Gang Starr with the rapper Guru and DJ Premier.

He has received influence from DJ's such as Cut Killer, Netik, Troubl, Unkut, D-Styles, Ligone, LL Cool DJ, Rafik, Craze, I-emerge.

Awards

French awards 
He has been 9 times champion of France.

World awards

International DJ Association Championship 
 2011 : Second place, technical category
 2013 : Third place, technical category
 2015 : Winner, technical category
 2016 : Second place, show category, with Mendosam et KTDR1

DMC World DJ Championship 
 2017 :  Second place, in solo
 2018 :  Winner, in solo, and online category
 2019 :  Winner, in solo
2020 :  Winner, in solo

References

See also 
 Channel on Youtube

French DJs
Year of birth missing (living people)
Living people
People from Biarritz